Gary Crouch (born 27 September 1946) is a former Australian rules footballer who played with Essendon in the Victorian Football League (VFL). After leaving Essendon, Crouch played for Rochester for one season before moving to Western Australia and joining Subiaco in the West Australian Football League (WAFL). He spent four seasons with Subiaco, playing on half back flank in the 1973 WAFL winning Grand Final team. He then moved back to Victoria to the Bendigo Football League (BFL). Crouch played one season with South Bendigo and was captain-coach of Sandhurst as well as regularly  representing and captain of the BFL in interleague matches.

Notes

External links 
		

Essendon Football Club past player profile
WAFL statistics

Living people
1946 births
Australian rules footballers from Victoria (Australia)
Essendon Football Club players
Rochester Football Club players
University Blacks Football Club players
South Bendigo Football Club players
Sandhurst Football Club players